Dasht-e Nāwar is an archaeological site in Ghazni province in Afghanistan. 
It's situated at the northern end of the lake, on and around Tepe Qādagak,  c. 60 km west of Ghazni. A brackish lake measuring c. 60 x 15 km. On the "beaches" to the east and north are several palaeolithic sites: Lower Palaeolithic on the east and Middle Palaeolithic on the north, which includes a large stone hill fortification and associated structures of uncertain date. The surface sites are covered in stone tools, 98% of which are obsidian. These include cleavers, large scrappers, choppers and microblades, some of which appear Lower Palaeolithic. The others bear similarities to the Darra-i Kūr industry.

Collection:
 BIAS - stone tools.

Field-work:
 1976 Dupree & Davis - survey.

References 

 Archaeological Gazetter of Afghanistan / Catalogue des Sites Archéologiques D'Afghanistan, Volume I, Warwick Ball, Editions Recherche sur les civilisations, Paris, 1982.

Archaeological sites in Afghanistan
Asian archaeology
Paleolithic